Huntingdale is a southeastern suburb of Perth, Western Australia. It is part of the City of Gosnells local government area, which suggested the name of the suburb in 1974 as it was used by local developers as a promotional name. It is largely a residential suburb with associated schools and small businesses, mainly existing to service local residents. Homes in the area include a section of older residences constructed mainly in the 1970s, while there was significant new development from the 1990s onward in the southern portion of Huntingdale. There are some remaining pockets of semi-rural land comprising remnants of horticultural and chicken-farming enterprises, but in the early 2000s these were fast being taken over for new residential developments.

References

External links

Suburbs of Perth, Western Australia
Suburbs in the City of Gosnells